Changchun Jiuyin Loans is a Chinese professional football club located in Changchun. They compete in the Chinese Women's Super League, and their home stadium is the Development Area Stadium.

Players
Darlene de Souza joined fellow Brazil women's national football team players Raquel Fernandes and Rafaelle Souza in transferring to Changchun Zhuoyue in January 2016.

In June 2017 the club signed Cristiane Rozeira from Paris Saint-Germain Féminine. Chinese media reported that they made Cristiane the highest-paid female footballer in the world.

First Team Squad

Former internationals

References

External links
 Official Website

 
Chinese Women's Super League clubs
2000 establishments in China
Association football clubs established in 2000
Women's football clubs in China
Sport in Changchun